The 2020 Montreal Alouettes season was scheduled to be the 54th season for the team in the Canadian Football League and their 66th overall.

The 2020 CFL season would have been the second season for Khari Jones as the Alouettes' head coach and offensive coordinator as he had the "interim" tag removed after he agreed to a three-year extension on November 26, 2019. This also would have been his first full season, including pre-season, as the team's head coach. It would have been the first season under the ownership of S and S Sportsco, which is operated by Sid Spiegel and Gary Stern. The new owners appointed Danny Maciocia as the team's general manager and named local businessman Mario Cecchini as the team's new president.

Training camps, pre-season games, and regular season games were initially postponed due to the COVID-19 pandemic in Montreal. The CFL announced on April 7, 2020 that the start of the 2020 season would not occur before July 2020. On May 20, 2020, it was announced that the league would likely not begin regular season play prior to September 2020. On August 17, 2020 however, the season was officially cancelled due to COVID-19.

Offseason

CFL National Draft 
The 2020 CFL National Draft took place on April 30, 2020. The Alouettes had ten selections in the eight-round draft, including four selections within the first 25 picks. Notably, the Alouettes traded their first-round pick to the Hamilton Tiger-Cats in the trade for Johnny Manziel.

CFL Global Draft
The 2020 CFL Global Draft was scheduled to take place on April 16, 2020. However, due to the COVID-19 pandemic, this draft and its accompanying combine were postponed to occur just before the start of training camp, which was ultimately cancelled. The Alouettes were scheduled to select fifth in each round with the number of rounds never announced.

Planned schedule

Preseason

Regular season

Team

Roster

Coaching staff

References

External links
 

Montreal Alouettes seasons
2020 Canadian Football League season by team
2020 in Quebec
2020s in Montreal